Thomas P. Shoesmith (January 25, 1922 – April 26, 2007) was an American diplomat who served as the United States ambassador to Malaysia from December 12, 1983 until his retirement February 14, 1987.

Early life and education
Shoesmith was born in Palmerton, Pennsylvania. He graduated from Stroudsburg High School in 1939 and continued his education at the University of Pennsylvania, graduating with a Bachelor of Science degree in education in 1943. He spent five years in the United States Army. When he returned, he earned a Master of Arts degree from Harvard University.

He entered the Army as a private in 1943 and in 1944, spent about a year at Yale University under the Army Specialized Training Program in the Japanese language program. Shortly afterwards, he entered the Japanese language program under the Military Intelligence Language School at the University of Michigan. When he finished, he was commissioned in 1945, sent to Japan as a Japanese language officer serving in the G-2 Section of SCAP for two years.

Career
He moved to Washington, DC to begin his career with the government. In 1955, he was inducted into the United States Foreign Service, beginning a 32 year tenure with the Department. During his career, he served in Hong Kong, Korea and Japan. He was appointed ambassador to Malaysia in 1983.

He assigned to Hong Kong as a consular officer, also assigned to Macau. After two years, he was reassigned to the Political Office.

Death
Shoesmith died of cancer at his home in Springfield, Virginia and was survived by his wife, Martha Houser Shoesmith. He had two children.

References

1922 births
2007 deaths
Ambassadors of the United States to Malaysia
United States Foreign Service personnel
People from Stroudsburg, Pennsylvania
People from Springfield, Virginia
Deaths from cancer in Virginia
University of Pennsylvania alumni
Harvard University alumni
United States Army officers
Consuls general of the United States in Hong Kong and Macau
United States Army personnel of World War II
American expatriates in Japan
American expatriates in South Korea
Military personnel from Pennsylvania